Carteremys is an extinct genus of pelomedusid pleurodiran turtle from the Maastrichtian (Late Cretaceous)-Eocene, of India based on the type species C. leithi, which was named in 1953 by E. Williams and was originally placed in the genera Hydraspis by H. J. Carter in 1852 and Testudo, also by H. J. Carter, in 1871.<ref>Carter, H. J. (1852). Geology of the Island of Bombay. Four Bombay Branch Roy. Asiatic Soc. 21:161-215</ref> A second species, C. pisdurensis, was named in 1977 by Sohan Lal Jain, but it was transferred to the separate genus Jainemys'' in 2020 by Joyce and Bandyopadhyay.<ref name="joyce&bandyopadhyay2020"/

References 

Turtles
Pelomedusidae
Eocene animals of Asia
Fossil taxa described in 1953